This page includes the discography of the Greek singer Mando.

Albums

Studio albums
* denotes unknown or unavailable information.

Official compilations
* denotes unknown or unavailable information.

References
Mando - Discography AllMusic. Retrieved 17:31, 2 May 2021 (UTC).

Discographies of Greek artists
Pop music discographies